Yealand Redmayne is a civil parish in Lancaster, Lancashire, England. It contains 15 buildings that are recorded in the National Heritage List for England as designated listed buildings.  Of these, one is at Grade II*, the middle grade, and the others are at Grade II, the lowest grade.  The parish contains the village of Yealand Redmayne, and is otherwise rural.  Most of the listed buildings are houses, farmhouses and farm buildings, many of them on the main street of the village.  The Lancaster Canal passes through the parish, and two bridges crossing it are listed, together with a milestone on its towpath.

Key

Buildings

Notes and references

Notes

Citations

Sources

Lists of listed buildings in Lancashire
Buildings and structures in the City of Lancaster